= Giorgi Margvelani =

Georgian rugby union player

Giorgi Margveliani
- Born: 24 April 1994 (age 32) Tbilisi, Georgia
- Height: 1.84 m (6 ft 0 in)
- Weight: 121 kg (19 st 1 lb)

Rugby union career
- Position: Prop,
Senior career
| Years | Team | Apps | (Points) |
| 2015-2017 | Agen | 10 | (0) |
- Correct as of 28/06/2015
- Correct as of 28/06/2016

Giorgi Margvelani (born 24 April 1994) is a professional rugby union player from Georgia. His position is Prop and he currently plays for USA Limoges in the national 2.
